Microcaecilia taylori is a species of caecilian in the family Siphonopidae. It is known from two widely separated populations, one in southern Suriname and other one in Pará, Brazil, south of the Amazon River. It is not clear whether the gap is real or whether the populations south of the Amazon River represent a distinct species. Microcaecilia taylori was confused with Microcaecilia marvaleewakeae before the latter was described in 2013.

Etymology
The specific name taylori honors Edward Harrison Taylor (1889–1978), an American herpetologist.

Description
There are 115–118 primary body rings. The eyes are invisible. The body color is purple with small, lighter spots. The ventral parts are transparent.

Habitat and conservation
Its natural habitats are primary tropical rainforest and forest islands in the savanna. It is a subterranean species also found under logs. There are no known threats to this species that is found in areas of low human impact. It occurs in the Sipaliwani Nature Reserve.

References

taylori
Amphibians of Brazil
Amphibians of Suriname
Amphibians described in 1979
Taxa named by Marinus Steven Hoogmoed
Taxa named by Ronald Archie Nussbaum
Taxonomy articles created by Polbot